Monthon were administrative subdivisions of Thailand at the beginning of the 20th century. The Thai word monthon is a translation of the word mandala (literally "circle"), in its sense of a type of political formation. The monthon were created as a part of the Thesaphiban (literally "local government") bureaucratic administrative system, introduced by Prince Damrong Rajanubhab which, together with the monthon, established step-by-step today's present provinces (changwat), districts (amphoe), and communes (tambon) throughout Thailand. Each monthon was led by a royal commissioner called Thesaphiban (เทศาภิบาล), later renamed to Samuhathesaphiban (สมุหเทศาภิบาล). The system was officially adopted by the 1897 Local Administration Act, after some monthon had been established and administrative details were sorted out.

History 

Before the Thesaphiban reforms, the country consisted of partially independent cities called mueang, some directly subordinate to the capital, some subordinate to larger mueang, or to one or more of the tributary kingdoms. Before the reforms, governors inherited their posts from their family lineage, and lived on taxes they collected in their area, a practice formally called tax farming. These were converted from hereditary governors to appointed governmental posts, as had been done by Chinese Yuan, Ming, and Qing-era rulers in first recognizing Tusi (tribal leaders) as imperial officials, then replacing them with imperial appointees. The arrangement resulted in governors being appointed and paid by the central government, and mueang developed into provinces. An essential step in the ending of tax farming was the creation on 3 September 1885 of the Royal Survey Department. Though its first fruits were not obtained until 1901, the department's cadastral surveys,  i.e., surveys of specific land parcels, made possible the defining of ownership for land registration and equitable taxation. The term changwat (จังหวัด) for the provinces was first used in 1907 for the provinces in Monthon Pattani, and by 1916 had come into general use.

Resistance to reform 
It took till around 1910 to implement the system throughout the country. The main reason for the slow implementation was the lack of suitably educated officials, but also the resistance of the traditional local leaders, which recalled the 1768–1770 resistance of the monk Chao Phra Faang to Thonburi reestablishment of Siamese authority. In 1902 along both banks of the Mekong, local revolts led by charismatic religious leaders called holy man or  broke out. The most serious of these was led by east-bank rebel Ong Keo against French authority in the former Thai tributary kingdom of Champasak. On the west bank in the area of Ubon Ratchathani, a less-well known former monk and phi bun headed a millenarian sect inspired by his apocalyptic prophecies, which spread fear, uncertainty and doubt among almost all the peoples along both banks of the river. The Bangkok government put down west bank resistance with little use of force, and cooperated with French Indochina officials insofar as limiting Thai authority to the west bank, later called Isan. East bank resistance however had no definitive end and became subsumed into the Second Indochina War. Far from the Mekong, resistance to reform continued into the 21st century in the Southern Thailand insurgency.

Further development 
In 1915 there were 19 monthons containing 72 provinces. Due to economic problems, several monthon were merged in 1925. Monthon Phetchabun had been dissolved in 1915. Only 14 monthon remained: Ayutthaya, Bangkok (Krung Thep), Chanthaburi, Nakhon Chaisi, Nakhon Ratchasima, Nakhon Sawan, Nakhon Si Thammarat, Pattani, Phayap, Phitsanulok, Phuket, Prachinburi, Ratchaburi, and Udon Thani. In 1932 another four were abolished: Chanthaburi, Nakhon Chaisi, Nakhon Sawan, and Pattani. Finally in 1933 the whole monthon system was abolished by the Provincial Administration Act 2476 B.E./A.D. 1933, part of the changes made after the coup d'état, which changed from an absolute to a constitutional monarchy, and the 70 provinces to second-level administrative divisions.

List of monthons

North

Phayap: Sanskrit Northwest. or Monthon Lao Chiang. In 1899, this northwestern monthon was described in Thai as monthon fai tawan tok chiang nuea (literally "northwest-side circle"). In 1900, this was shortened to the Sanskrit for "northwest". The actual administrative reform was established gradually between 1907 and 1915, succeeding the previous high commissionership. It covered the northern principalities of former Lan Na, the provinces Chiang Mai, Lamphun, Mae Hong Son, Lampang, Chiang Rai, Nan, and Phrae.

Maharat: Monthon Maharat was created in 1915, when Monthon Phayap was split into two halves. It covered the eastern part of former Phayap, i.e., the provinces Chiang Rai, Nan, Lampang, and Phrae.
Nakhon Sawan: Monthon Nakhon Sawan was created in 1895, and was thus among the first created. It covered the provinces of Nakhon Sawan, Chai Nat, Kamphaeng Phet, Manorom, Phayuha Khiri, Sankhaburi, Tak, Uthai Thani. In 1932 the monthon was incorporated into Monthon Ayutthaya.
Phitsanulok: Monthon Phitsanulok was established in 1894. It covered the provinces Phitsanulok, Phichai, Phichit, Sukhothai, Sawankhalok.
Phetchabun: Monthon Phetchabun was split off from Monthon Nakhon Ratchasima in 1899. It consisted of the two provinces Lom Sak and Phetchabun, which were later merged. It then became the only monthon covering a single province. It was temporarily included into Monthon Pitsanulok from 1903 to 1907, before it was finally abolished in 1915 and incorporated into Monthon Phitsanulok.

Northeast
Nakhon Ratchasima: Monthon Nakhon Ratchasima was the first monthon to be created in 1893. It covered the provinces Nakhon Ratchasima (Khorat), Buriram, Chaiyaphum. In 1899 Monthon Phetchabun was split off from Khorat.
Isan: Monthon Isan was established in 1900. In June 1912 it was split into the two parts, Monthon Roi Et and Monthon Ubon.
Roi Et: Monthon Roi Et was split from Monthon Isan in 1912. It contained the provinces Roi Et, Kalasin, and Maha Sarakham.
Ubon or Monthon Laokao: Monthon Ubon was split from Monthon Isan in 1912. It included Ubon Ratchathani, Khukhan, Sisaket, and Surin.
Udon or Monthon Lao Phuan: Monthon Udon was established in 1899. It contained the provinces Udon Thani, Khon Kaen, Loei, Nakhon Phanom, Nong Khai and Sakon Nakhon.

South
Phuket: Monthon Phuket was established in 1898, succeeding a previously established commissionership. It consisted of the provinces Phuket, Thalang, Ranong, Phang Nga, Takua Pa, Krabi, Kelantan, and Terengganu. In 1909 Satun was added when most of the area of Monthon Kedah along with Kelantan and Terengganu were ceded to Britain.
Chumphon: Monthon Chumphon was established in 1896 consisting of the provinces Chumphon, Chaiya, Kanchanadit, and Lang Suan. Chaiya and Kanchanadit were later merged into one province named Chaiya. In 1905 the monthon administration was moved to Ban Don, the center of Chaiya province. Together with the renaming of Chaiya to Surat Thani the monthon was renamed "Monthon Surat". In 1925 the monthon was incorporated into Monthon Nakhon Si Thammarat.
Nakhon Si Thammarat: Monthon Nakhon Si Thammarat was established in 1896, consisting of the provinces Songkhla, Nakhon Si Thammarat, and Phattalung.
Pattani: Monthon Pattani was created in 1906, and covered the so-called Seven Malay Provinces Pattani (Tani), Yala, Sai Buri, Yaring, Nong Chik, Raman, Ra-ngae. In 1932 the monthon was incorporated into Monthon Nakhon Si Thammarat.
 Syburi: Monthon Syburi was established in 1897. It covered the provinces Kedah, Perlis. and Satun. In 1909 Kedah was ceded to Britain. Satun, as the only remaining province, was added to Monthon Phuket.

Central
Krung Thep (Bangkok): The area around the capital was under the control of the Ministry of Urban Affairs, however a similar administration was established with the Monthon Krung Theb in 1897. It consisted of the provinces Phra Nakhon, Thon Buri, Nonthaburi, Pathum Thani, Phra Pradaeng (Nakhon Khueankhan), Samut Prakan, Thanyaburi, Min Buri. Pathum Thani and Thanyaburi later transferred to Monthon Ayutthaya. In 1915 it was renamed Krung Thep Phra Maha Nakhon (Bangkok metropolis). In 1922 the Ministry of Urban Affairs was dissolved and put under the Ministry of Interior, like all the other monthon.
Ayutthaya: Monthon Ayutthaya was created in 1893 as Monthon Krung Kao (Old Capital Monthon), consisting of the provinces Ayutthaya, also called Krung Kao or "old capital", Ang Thong, Lop Buri, Phrom Buri, Sara Buri.
Ratchaburi: Monthon Ratchaburi was created in 1895 and covered the provinces Ratchaburi, Kanchanaburi, Samut Songkhram, Phetchaburi and Prachuap Khiri Khan.
Nakhon Chai Si: Monthon Nakhon Chai Si was established in 1895, consisting of the provinces Nakhon Chai Si, Samut Sakhon, and Suphan Buri. In 1932 the monthon was incorporated into Monthon Ratchaburi.

East
Prachinburi: Monthon Prachinburi was established in 1893, covering the provinces Prachin Buri, Chachoengsao, Nakhon Nayok, and Phanom Sarakham.
Burapha: Monthon Burapha was established in 1896, and covered the provinces Sisophon, Battambang, Phanomsok, and Siammarat, all in modern-day Cambodia. In 1907 the area was ceded to French Indochina.
Chanthaburi: Monthon Chanthaburi was established in 1906, covering the provinces Chanthaburi, Rayong, and Trat. The monthon was created just before the area of monthon Burapha was ceded, and the French returned Trat Province to Thai authority. In 1932 the monthon was incorporated into Monthon Prachinburi.

Boriwen
The larger monthon Phayap, Udon Thani, and Isan had an additional administrative level between monthon and provincial administration. Three to five boriwen (บริเวณ), each administered by a commissioner (khaluang boriwen, ข้าหลวงบริเวณ).

See also
 Administrative divisions of Thailand
 Mandala (Southeast Asian political model)
 Mueang
 Native Chieftain System
 Past provinces of Thailand
 Royal Thai Survey Department

References

Further reading

External links
History of the Bangkok Metropolitan Council

 
Subdivisions of Thailand
Types of administrative division